Woodward, Inc. is an American designer, manufacturer, and service provider of control systems and control system components (e.g. fuel pumps, engine controls, actuators, air valves, fuel nozzles, and electronics) for aircraft engines, industrial engines and turbines, power generation and mobile industrial equipment.

Woodward, Inc. was founded as The Woodward Governor Company by Amos Woodward in 1870. Initially, the company made controls for waterwheels (first patent No. 103,813), and then moved to hydro turbines. In the 1920s and 1930s, Woodward began designing controls for diesel and other reciprocating engines and for industrial turbines. Also in the 1930s, Woodward developed a governor for variable-pitch aircraft propellers. Woodward parts were notably used in the GE engine on United States military's first turbine-powered aircraft. Starting in the 1950s, Woodward began designing electronic controls, first analog and then digital units.

Historical information
The company was founded in Rockford, Illinois, in 1870 with Amos W. Woodward's invention of a non compensating mechanical waterwheel governor (U.S. patent No. 103,813). Thirty years later, his son Elmer patented the first successful mechanical compensating governor for hydraulic turbines (U.S. patent No. 583,527). In 1933, the company expanded its product line to include diesel engine controls (U.S. patent No. 2,039,507) and aircraft propeller governors (British patent No. 470,284). Woodward governors followed the rapid advancement of diesel engine applications for railroads, maritime and electrical generation in many fields. The advent of gas turbine engines for aircraft and industrial uses offered still more opportunities for Woodward designed fuel controls. And, of course, the science of electronics has added impetus to this industry.

Elmer E. Woodward conceived, designed, and developed the first successful propeller control in 1933. This model PW-34 propeller governor is on display at the Udvar-Hazy annex of the Smithsonian National Air and Space Museum.

Modern day company
As of 2007, Woodward Governor Company became a billion-dollar company with establishments worldwide, including Japan, China, and Europe.

On January 26, 2011, the company announced that shareholders had approved the name change to Woodward, Inc.

A growing number of general aviation and commuter aircraft rely on Woodward AES overspeed governors, synchronizers and synchrophasers for turboshaft, turboprop, and reciprocating engines. , approximately 34% of the company's sales were to the defense market, including parts for the V-22 Osprey ($645,000 revenue per aircraft) and the F/A-18 ($335,000 revenue per aircraft). The engines that are controlled by Woodward Aircraft engines systems include those from Honeywell (TPE331), General Electric (CT7), Pratt & Whitney Canada (PT6A series), Raytheon, Vans, and Rotax Corporations.

In April 2018, Woodward Inc. purchased L'Orange GmbH for $859 million.  This supplier of fuel-injection components for stationary, marine, offshore, and industrial engines was part of Rolls-Royce's power-systems business in Germany, the US and China. On January 12, 2020, the company announced an intent to merge with Hexcel, according to the Wall Street Journal. On April 20, it was announced the merger was called off, as a result of the health crisis caused by the COVID-19 pandemic. The COVID19 crisis also led to a sharp drop in revenues for Woodward, Inc.

Woodward family patents

References

1870 establishments in Illinois
Aerospace companies of the United States
Aerospace materials
Aircraft component manufacturers of the United States
Companies based in Fort Collins, Colorado
Companies listed on the Nasdaq
Electrical engineering companies of the United States
Manufacturing companies based in Colorado
Manufacturing companies established in 1870
Turbine manufacturers